Jiksa Tolosa (born 11 December 1998) is an Ethiopian long-distance runner. In 2018, he competed in the men's half marathon at the 2018 IAAF World Half Marathon Championships held in Valencia, Spain. He finished in 23rd place.

References

External links 
 

Living people
1998 births
Place of birth missing (living people)
Ethiopian male long-distance runners
20th-century Ethiopian people
21st-century Ethiopian people